Sabrina Del Mastio (born 10 March 1971) is an Italian softball player who competed in the 2004 Summer Olympics.

References

1971 births
Living people
Italian softball players
Olympic softball players of Italy
Softball players at the 2004 Summer Olympics